The Japanese Adverse Drug Event Report (JADER) database is a spontaneous reporting system of drug adverse events which is managed by the Pharmaceuticals and Medical Devices Agency (PMDA) in Japan. It has been available since 2012.

See also
 Pharmacovigilance
 FDA Adverse Event Reporting System (FAERS)

References

Government databases in Japan
Pharmacovigilance databases